Russia-24 is a state-owned Russian-language news channel from Russia. It covers major national and international events as well as focuses on domestic issues. It is owned by VGTRK.

History
The broadcast began January 1, 2007 in Russia, February 7 on the West Coast of the United States, May 19, 2008 in Serbia, and October 9, 2008 in Kyrgyzstan. VGTRK Crimea started broadcasting on March 10, 2014.

The editor-in-chief of the channel is Evgeny Bekasov (since 2012).

The channel ostensibly aims to give a broad and impartial  outline of life in all of Russia’s regions from its European exclave of Kaliningrad to Vladivostok in the Far East. The channel was named Vesti until 1 January 2010, when the public-owned VGTRK rebranded its channels.

Russia 24 was banned in Ukraine, Moldova, the United Kingdom, and the EU as a result of the 2022 Russian invasion of Ukraine. The channel falsely claimed that the Bucha massacre was staged and suggested that footage of actors placing mannequins on a film set in St. Petersburg were Ukrainian soldiers using the mannequins to "pass it off as a corpse".

The United Kingdom and Australia imposed sanctions upon Evgeniy Poddubny, one of the top war correspondents and propagandists of Russia-24.

Logos

References

External links
 
 
 

Russian-language television stations in Russia
24-hour television news channels in Russia
Television channels and stations established in 2006
Legislature broadcasters